is a train station in the city of Azumino, Nagano Prefecture, Japan, operated by East Japan Railway Company (JR East).

Lines
Tazawa Station is served by the Shinonoi Line and is 21.6 kilometers from the terminus of the line at Shiojiri Station.

Station layout
The station consists of one ground-level island platform serving a two tracks, connected to the station building by an underground passage. The station is a  Kan'i itaku station.

Platforms

History
Tazawa Station opened on 15 June 1902. With the privatization of Japanese National Railways (JNR) on 1 April 1987, the station came under the control of JR East.

Passenger statistics
In fiscal 2015, the station was used by an average of 530 passengers daily (boarding passengers only).

Surrounding area
Toyoshina-Higashi Elementary School

See also
 List of railway stations in Japan

References

External links

 JR East station information 

Railway stations in Nagano Prefecture
Railway stations in Japan opened in 1902
Stations of East Japan Railway Company
Shinonoi Line
Azumino, Nagano